Hi, Gaucho! was a 1935 American comedy film directed by Tommy Atkins (who also wrote the story), from a screenplay by Adele Buffington. Released by RKO Radio Pictures on October 11, 1935, the film stars John Carroll (in his first credited role), Steffi Duna, Rod La Rocque, and Montagu Love.

References

External links

 

1935 films
American comedy films
1935 comedy films
American black-and-white films
Films set in Argentina
RKO Pictures films
1930s American films